Brendon Taylor (born 18 February 1972) is an Australian handball player. He competed in the men's tournament at the 2000 Summer Olympics.

References

External links
 

1972 births
Living people
Australian male handball players
Olympic handball players of Australia
Handball players at the 2000 Summer Olympics
Sportspeople from Newcastle, New South Wales